Brandon Jung (born April 28, 1986 in Surrey, British Columbia) is a male water polo player from Canada. He was a member of the Canada men's national water polo team, that claimed the bronze medal at the 2007 Pan American Games in Rio de Janeiro, Brazil.

References

1986 births
Living people
Canadian sportspeople of Korean descent
Olympic water polo players of Canada
Sportspeople from Surrey, British Columbia
Water polo players at the 2008 Summer Olympics
Pan American Games bronze medalists for Canada
Canadian male water polo players
Pan American Games medalists in water polo
Water polo players at the 2007 Pan American Games
Medalists at the 2007 Pan American Games